Ski Jumping Canada is the governing federation for ski jumping in Canada. It is responsible for the governance of all ski jumping competitions in Canada and for the operation of the national team. Canada has competed in ski jumping at the Winter Olympics since 1928.

Team Canada

Women's team

Natasha Bodnarchuk
Natalie Eilers
Nicole Maurer
Abigail Strate
Alexandria Loutitt

Men's team
Mackenzie Boyd-Clowes
Matthew Soukup

Funding
Ski Jumping Canada is funded through partnerships Sport Canada, Canadian Olympic Committee, and the Snow Sports Consortium's key partners -  Karbon is the National team's official clothing sponsor, along with Bracelayer Canada and SEIZ. 

Sport Canada joined as a funding partner in 2016 after Ski Jumping Canada was recognized through the Sport Funding Accountability Framework. The sport is not currently funded by Own The Podium.

See also
Canadian Snowboard Federation, Canadian snowboard sports federation
Canadian Freestyle Ski Association, Canadian freestyle skiing sports federation
Nordic Combined Ski Canada, Canadian Nordic combined skiing sports federation
Cross Country Canada, Canadian cross country skiing sports federation
Alpine Canada, Canadian alpine skiing sports federation
Biathlon Canada, Canadian biathlon ski-shooting sports federation
Own the Podium

References
 OTP Funded Sports
 Team Canada

External links

Ski jumping
Ski jumping in Canada
Ski jumping organizations